Lumphead cichlid may refer to:

 Cyrtocara moorii, a fish
 Steatocranus casuarius, a fish